Elena Igorevna Radionova (born 6 January 1999) is a Russian former competitive figure skater. She is the 2015 World bronze medalist, a two-time (2015–2016) European silver medalist, a two-time Grand Prix Final medalist, 2017 Winter Universiade champion and the 2015 Russian national champion. On the junior level, she is the first ladies skater to win two World Junior titles (2013 & 2014) and she won the 2012–13 JGP Final as well.

Personal life
Radionova was born 6 January 1999 in Moscow, Russia. She is the only child in her family. Her interests include writing lyrics, ballet, modern dancing, and singing. She was in a relationship with a Russian football player Konstantin Kuchayev.

Career
Radionova's father introduced her to skating when she was three years and nine months, seeking to align her club foot. Since the age of four, she has been coached by Inna Goncharenko at CSKA Moscow. Her figure skating role models are Yuna Kim, Mao Asada, and Carolina Kostner.

Early career
In the 2010–11 season, Radionova finished 4th at the 2011 Russian Junior Championships. She won the Zhuk Memorial kids' competition.

In the 2011–12 season, Radionova appeared at her first senior Russian Championships, finishing 5th, and went on to win the bronze medal at the Russian Junior Championships that same season. Not yet age-eligible for junior ISU events, Radionova competed in the novice event at the 2012 Triglav Trophy, winning the gold medal.

2012–13 season: Junior international debut
In the 2012–13 season, Radionova made her ISU Junior Grand Prix debut and won her events in France and Austria. She qualified for the JGP Final in Sochi, where she won the gold medal, finishing more than eleven points ahead of silver medalist, Hannah Miller, from the United States.

At the 2013 Russian Championships, Radionova won the silver medal in the senior event ahead of defending champion Adelina Sotnikova and then took the junior title. Radionova placed fifth in the short program and first in the free skate at the 2013 World Junior Championships in Milan, Italy. She was awarded the gold medal while defending champion Yulia Lipnitskaya took silver and Anna Pogorilaya the bronze — resulting in a Russian sweep of the podium. Radionova then won the gold medal in the junior event at the 2013 Triglav Trophy.

2013–14 season: Senior international debut
In an interview before the 2013–14 season, Radionova said: "I don't think that I am such a great athlete that won a lot. I just won the smallest one, Junior Worlds. In reality, there are competitions that are much more serious and more difficult. I don't feel any pressure yet. I just think I have to work harder and more, because there is no limit to perfection."

Radionova made her senior international debut at the 2013 Nebelhorn Trophy. Placing first in both programs, she won the gold medal by a margin of more than 25 points over two-time world champion Miki Ando from Japan. The 2013 Skate America was Radionova's first senior Grand Prix event. She was awarded the bronze medal at Skate America and then silver at the 2013 NHK Trophy, while gold at both events went to Japan's Mao Asada, whose skating Radionova admires. Radionova's results qualified her to her first Grand Prix Final. At the event in Fukuoka, Japan, she finished fourth overall.

Radionova won the bronze medal at the 2014 Russian Championships after placing third in both the short and long program. Though an injury caused her to miss the Russian junior nationals, she was later added to the Russian team for the 2014 World Junior Championships. At the event, Radionova became the first ladies' single skater to repeat as World Junior champion.  Scoring 66.90 points in the short program, 127.39 in the free skate, and 194.29 for the combined total, she broke junior-level ladies' records previously held by Mirai Nagasu and Yulia Lipnitskaya. Radionova, Serafima Sakhanovich, and Evgenia Medvedeva produced Russia's second consecutive sweep of the World Junior ladies' podium. During the off-season, Radionova performed in various Russian cities with Show of the Champions and in Korea with Igor Bobrin's Theatre on Ice.

2014–15 season: World bronze medal

Radionova made her season debut at the 2014 Japan Open where she placed first in the ladies' free skate and helped Team Europe win the gold medal. Her Grand Prix assignments were the 2014 Skate America and 2014 Trophée Éric Bompard. At Skate America, Radionova ranked second in the short program, first in the free skate, and won the gold medal by a margin of 5.85 points over compatriot Elizaveta Tuktamysheva. At the Trophée Bompard, Radionova won the gold medal and set personal best scores. She scored a total of 203.92 points, making her the first ladies' singles skater to score over 200 points this season. The results qualified Radionova for the 2014–15 Grand Prix Final. Although a fever prior to the event reduced her training time, she took the silver medal in Barcelona, finishing behind teammate Elizaveta Tuktamysheva. At the 2015 Russian Championships, she was first in both segments and won her first national title. Radionova was the silver medalist at the 2015 European Championships where she placed 1st in the short program and second in the free skate. During the 2015 World Championships, she stated that she was feeling ill and weak, having picked up a virus, but would compete anyway. Ranked second in the short program and sixth in the free skate, Radionova won the bronze medal in her world debut. She concluded her season at the 2015 World Team Trophy, placing third in the short program and second in the free skate. Both Radionova's and Tuktamysheva's efforts would aid team Russia to earn a silver medal.

2015–16 season
Radionova intended to begin her season at the 2015 Finlandia Trophy but withdrew due to health problems.
Although she was not fully recovered from a high fever and virus, she insisted on competing at her first Grand Prix event of the season, the 2015 Cup of China; she won the bronze medal behind Mao Asada and Rika Hongo. At the 2015 Rostelecom Cup, held in late November in Moscow, she won the gold medal ahead of teammates Evgenia Medvedeva and Adelina Sotnikova. It was Russia's first sweep of a Grand Prix ladies' podium since the 1999 Cup of Russia. With this victory, Radionova was once the only competitor who had defeated Evgenia Medvedeva since her arrival in the senior level until Alina Zagitova in 2018.

Radionova qualified for the 2015–16 Grand Prix Final, held in December in Barcelona. She won the bronze medal in Spain, having ranked second in the short and fourth in the free skate after falling from her triple loop, a scratchy triple lutz and two footing her last toe loop combination. Later that month, she won the silver medal behind Medvedeva at the 2016 Russian Championships, having placed second in both segments.

On 27 to 30 January, Radionova competed at the 2016 European Championships in Bratislava, Slovakia. She repeated as the European silver medalist while her teammates completed the podium, with Medvedeva winning the gold and Anna Pogorilaya taking the bronze. In April, she finished sixth at the 2016 World Championships in Boston after placing fifth in both segments. Radionova was then invited to the 2016 Team Challenge Cup where she finished 7th in the short after singling her axel but moved up to 5th in the free. Team Europe eventually finished in second place with Radionova taking a Team silver medal and prize money.

2016–17 season
Radionova's Grand Prix assignments for the 2016–17 season, her first event was at the 2016 Rostelecom Cup where she finished second in both the short and free skating, winning the silver medal overall behind teammate Anna Pogorilaya. Then in her next event at the 2016 Cup of China, Radionova finished second at the short program and won the free skating, winning the gold medal with a total of 205.90 points qualifying to her fourth consecutive Grand Prix Final, to be held in December in Marseilles, France.

Radionova participated in the 2017 Winter Universiade in Almaty, Kazakhstan from 1 to 5 February. She finished first in both the short and the long programs, with a total of 196.61 points earning her the gold medal.

On 28 April 2017, it was reported that Radionova would train under Elena Buianova under the same club in CSKA. Her split with her former coach Goncharenko was amicable.

2017–18 season 
Radionova finished 4th at the 2017 Rostelecom Cup and took bronze at the 2017 Cup of China. She finished a disappointing 10th place at the 2018 Russian Figure Skating Championships.

2018–19 season and onward 
Radionova withdrew from the 2018 Skate America and 2018 NHK Trophy due to a back injury.

On 22 September 2020, she announced her retirement from competition.

Records and achievements
 First ladies' skater in history to win two World Junior titles (2013 & 2014).
 Former world record holder for the junior ladies' short program (66.90 points), set at the 2014 World Junior Championships on 14 March 2014. Record was broken nine months later on 11 December 2014 by Evgenia Medvedeva (Russia).
 Former world record holder for the junior ladies' free program (127.39 points), set at the 2014 World Junior Championships on 14 March 2014. Record was broken on 12 December 2015 by Polina Tsurskaya (Russia).
 Former world record holder for the junior ladies' combined total score (194.29 points), set at the 2014 World Junior Championships on 14 March 2014. Record was broken on 12 December 2015 by Polina Tsurskaya (Russia).

List of Radionova's junior world record scores

Endorsements
Radionova signed a sponsorship deal with American skating boots manufacturer Riedell Skates.

Programs

Competitive highlights

GP: Grand Prix; CS: Challenger Series; JGP: Junior Grand Prix

Detailed results

Senior level

Small medals for short and free programs awarded only at ISU Championships. At team events, medals awarded for team results only.

Junior level

Small medals for short and free programs awarded only at ISU Championships. Previous ISU world best highlighted in bold.

References

External links

 
 

! colspan="3" style="border-top: 5px solid #78FF78;" |Historical World Junior Record Holders (before season 2018–19)

1999 births
Living people
European Figure Skating Championships medalists
Russian female single skaters
Figure skaters from Moscow
World Figure Skating Championships medalists
World Junior Figure Skating Championships medalists
Universiade medalists in figure skating
Universiade gold medalists for Russia
Competitors at the 2017 Winter Universiade
Association footballers' wives and girlfriends
21st-century Russian women